Sergio Ojeda (23 January 1906 – 1 January 1996) was a Chilean boxer. He competed in the men's light heavyweight event at the 1928 Summer Olympics.

References

External links
 

1906 births
1996 deaths
Light-heavyweight boxers
Chilean male boxers
Olympic boxers of Chile
Boxers at the 1928 Summer Olympics
Sportspeople from Santiago
20th-century Chilean people